The Selden Carol Book is a medieval carol manuscript held by the Bodleian Library in Oxford (MS Selden B.26). Along with the Trinity Carol Roll, with which it shares five contemporaneous carols and texts (for example the Agincourt Carol), it is one of the main sources for 15th century English carols, and like the Trinity Roll contains the music as the well as the texts. The inclusion of Deo Gracias Anglia referencing Henry V's victory at Agincourt in 1415 gives an indication of the date of composition of the carols.

Origin
The manuscript was part of the extensive bequest of the English jurist, polymath and antiquarian John Selden (1584—1654). Prior to his ownership, it is recorded in the collection of Bishop John Alcock (1430—1500) who was Bishop of Worcester and later Ely. B.26 contains five unrelated manuscripts which were bound together into a single volume about 1660; the musical section of the manuscript of 31 leaves known as the Selden Carol Book dates from the second quarter of the fifteenth century and contains songs and polyphony in Latin and Middle English, with some of the carols alternating between the two, a common form for carols of the period known as macaronic.

Dr Richard L Greene in The Early English Carols and Thomas Gibson Duncan in A Companion to the Middle English Lyric associate the book with the priory at Worcester, now Worcester Cathedral. Greene states that Worcester was "a house where there was much carolling" and accounts for Christmas entertainments suggest new songs and carols introduced by visitors were written down for future performance, with the prior employing a scribe to perform this task on Christmas Day. Census-Catalogue of Manuscript Sources of Polyphonic Music 1400-1550 also suggests Worcester, but adds that it may have been copied there for St. Mary Newarke College, a now-lost collegiate church in Leicester.

Description
The Census-Catalogue of Manuscript Sources of Polyphonic Music 1400-1550 estimates that the work was copied by two main scribes with additional material copied by eight to ten additional hands. Timothy Glover concludes that while it was created at a monastery, the two secular drinking songs at the end of the manuscript suggests it was unlikely to have been used in a liturgical setting. In addition, the elaborate Initials and line space decoration would suggest it was not used for performance purposes.

The carols are noted in mensural notation on staves. The beginning of each song is marked by decorative initials in blue ink with red adornments. The text is handwritten in the Cursiva Anglicana script of the period, a form of writing initially used for letters and legal documents which soon became the most commonly used script for copying English literary texts of the period, for example the manuscripts of Geoffrey Chaucer and William Langland. The 'burdens', a type of refrain performed at the beginning of the song and between verses, are the earliest example of a carol manuscript explicitly directing what it now known as a 'chorus'. The incorporation of Latin phrases from the liturgy of the Catholic Church feature in many of the burdens – as all church services were conducted in Latin, even non-speakers would have been familiar with their meaning.

Contents
There are thirty carols and songs with music in the manuscript, plus a few marginalia fragments.

See also
 List of Christmas carols

References

15th-century manuscripts
Bodleian Library collection
Christmas carol collections
Medieval music manuscript sources